The Mulwaree River, a perennial river that is part of the Hawkesbury-Nepean catchment, is located in the Southern Tablelands region of New South Wales, Australia.

Course and features
The Mulwaree River rises east of the Lake George Escarpment, below Mount Fairy, near the locality of Hammonds Hill, and flows generally north northeast, joined by two minor tributaries, before reaching its confluence with the Wollondilly River at North Goulburn. The river descends  over its  course.

Tributaries include Bongaralaby Creek and Crisps Creek.

The Mulwaree and its associated wetlands are important breeding grounds and drought refuge for Australian birds. These wetlands are listed on the directory of Important Wetlands of Australia.

See also 

 Lake Bathurst (New South Wales)
 Lake George (New South Wales)
 List of rivers of New South Wales (L–Z)
 List of rivers of Australia
 Rivers of New South Wales

References

External links
 

Rivers of New South Wales
Goulburn Mulwaree Council